Happy End of You is a remix album by Japanese pop band Pizzicato Five. The album was released on May 5, 1998 by Matador Records. It consists of remixes of songs from the band's album Happy End of the World, with the exception of "Contact", which originally appeared on Romantique 96.

Track listing

References

External links
 

1998 remix albums
Pizzicato Five albums
Matador Records remix albums
Japanese-language remix albums